Warwick Airport  is located at Warwick, Queensland, Australia.

Australian Air Force Cadets

No. 2 Wing Australian Air Force Cadets operates their glider training from this airport.

See also
 List of airports in Queensland

References

Airports in Queensland